Tseng Shu-cheng is a Taiwanese politician. He has served as the Deputy Minister of National Development Council since 20 May 2016.

Academic career
Tseng obtained his bachelor's degree in architecture from National Cheng Kung University in 1984, master's degree in architecture from Tunghai University in 1987 and doctoral degree in civil engineering from National Taiwan University in 1994. He then taught at National University of Tainan.

References

Living people
Political office-holders in the Republic of China on Taiwan
Year of birth missing (living people)